Kevin Lewis (born 17 October 1970) is an English former footballer who played in the Football League for Stoke City. His uncle of the same name, was also a footballer who played for Stoke City.

Career
Lewis was born in Kingston upon Hull and played in the youth team of Stoke City. With Stoke's 1987–88 campaign coming to a close with nothing to play for manager Mick Mills decided to give youth team players some first team experience and Lewis made his a substitute in a 2–0 defeat away at Millwall on 30 April 1988. He never made it as a professional footballer and left for non-league Stafford Rangers after an unsuccessful spell at Mansfield Town.

Career statistics

References

English footballers
Stoke City F.C. players
Mansfield Town F.C. players
Stafford Rangers F.C. players
English Football League players
1970 births
Living people
Association football defenders